The South Korean national baseball team also known as Blue Wave() is the national baseball team of South Korea. It won the Baseball World Cup in 1982, and participated in the Summer Olympic Games of 1984, 1988, 1996, and 2000. At the 2008 Summer Olympics, it won the gold medal in a final victory against Cuba. Currently, the South Korean men's baseball team is ranked fourth in the WBSC World Rankings. Team South Korea came in second in the 12-team 2019 WBSC Premier12 Tournament, and thereby qualified to compete in baseball at the 2020 Olympics. At the Olympics in 2021 it faced Israel, Japan, Mexico, the United States, and the Dominican Republic.

Results and fixtures
The following is a list of professional baseball match results currently active in the latest version of the WBSC World Rankings, as well as any future matches that have been scheduled.

Legend

2019

2021

2023

Tournament record

World Baseball Classic

2006 World Baseball Classic

The South Korean team playing in the 2006 World Baseball Classic included not just South Korean players based in South Korea, but South Korean players in the U.S. from Major League Baseball. In the Classic, the team played in and won every game they played in Pool A. They advanced to round two, again winning all three games to secure a place in the semifinals. Upon reaching the semifinals, the South Korean government announced that it would waive for the players on the team the mandatory two-year military service required of all young South Korean men. However, at the semifinals, the South Korean team lost to Japan, whom they had beaten twice previously. This led to controversy over the regulations of the WBC concerning the fact that South Korea had to face Japan three times and that it was Japan that was allowed to go to the finals, when it had four victories and three losses up to that point, two of those losses to South Korea, while the South Korean team, which had only one loss and had already beaten Japan twice, was eliminated from the finals.

2009 World Baseball Classic

South Korea competed in the 2009 World Baseball Classic, playing the first round in Pool A in Tokyo. South Korea opened the tournament with a 7–0 rout of Chinese Taipei. South Korea then lost to Japan in a 14–2 contest shortened to 7 innings by the WBC's early termination rule. In its third game, South Korea soundly defeated China 14–0 in a similarly shortened contest, securing advancement to the second round and ousting China from the tournament. South Korea won the final Pool A game by a 1–0 win over Japan in order to advance as the Pool A winner. In Pool 1, the round 2 of the WBC, South Korea beat Mexico 8–2 and then went on to beat Japan again 4–1, securing advancement to the semifinals. South Korea beat Venezuela 10–2 to secure a spot on the finals. In the final game however, South Korea lost to Japan 5–3.

2013 World Baseball Classic

South Korea competed in the 2013 World Baseball Classic for the third time, playing the first round in Pool B at the Taichung Intercontinental Baseball Stadium in Taichung, Taiwan, facing the Netherlands, Chinese Taipei and Australia. The Korean team lost the first game against the Netherlands 5–0, but won two next games against Chinese Taipei and Australia. Despite this, South Korea was eliminated in the first round for the first time since advancing to the semi-finals in the 2009 World Baseball Classic. However, even after elimination, South Korea earned their direct qualification to the upcoming 2017 World Baseball Classic.

2017 World Baseball Classic
South Korea lost the first game in the first round to surprising newcomers Israel, 2–1 in 10 innings. They also lost their second game against the Netherlands 5–0. They were eliminated for the second time ever, after their poor performance at the 2013 World Baseball Classic, as Israel and the Netherlands advanced to the next round. South Korea took third place in the pool, as it beat Taiwan in 10 innings, 11–8.

South Korea is facing Israel, the Netherlands, and Taiwan in the 2017 World Baseball Classic.

2023 World Baseball Classic

In January 2020, the WBC announced the 16 national teams which participated at the 2017 World Baseball Classic, which included South Korea, will automatically qualify for the tournament.

Premier12 Tournament

2015
Team South Korea won the 2015 WBSC Premier12 Tournament.

2019
Team South Korea came in second in the 12-team 2019 WBSC Premier12 Tournament, which was held in November 2019. Two quota spots were allocated from the Tournament, of the spots for six baseball teams at the 2020 Olympic Games, with South Korea qualifying as the top finisher from the Asia/Oceana territory (other than Japan, which already qualified as host).

Summer Olympics

2000 Sydney Olympics

Since the 2000 Summer Olympic Games in Sydney, professional baseball players have been permitted to play and the South Korean team that was formed was often called the "Korean Dream Team". This team won the bronze medal.. At that time, the top four teams (Cuba, United States, South Korea and Japan) advanced to the semi-finals. In the semi-final game, the South Koreans faced the United States team and lost. In the bronze medal match, the South Koreans played against the Japanese and won the game 3–1.

2008 Beijing Olympics

After losing 4–3 to Japan at the 2007 Asian Baseball Championships, the South Koreans finished with a 2–1 record and were forced to seek entrance to the 2008 Olympics via the Final Olympic Qualifying Tournament to be held March 7–14, 2008 in Taichung, Taiwan.

The South Korean roster, for the qualifying, is mainly professional players from the Korea Baseball Organization and is not subjected to the scheduling conflicts that troubled the teams from Australia, Canada, and Mexico.

Going into the tournament rated by the experts as an outsider, or a dark horse at most, South Korea surprised everybody by finishing the group stage in first place with a perfect 7–0 record. The team began its run with come from behind win against heavily favored United States, scoring the winning run in the bottom of the 9th inning with a sacrifice fly. Disappointment soon followed the next game, however, as China (undeniably the weakest team in the tournament) stymied South Korea for most of the game before the game was suspended because of rain in the 6th inning with a 0–0 score. South Korea bounced back the following day with a tightly contested 1–0 victory over Canada, with Ryu Hyun-Jin recording a complete game shutout. After dispatching their rivals Japan 5–3 in the next game, South Korea finished off China in the continuation of the aforementioned suspended game by winning 1–0 in the extra innings. South Korea then clinched their place in the final four by beating Chinese Taipei 9–8, followed by another surprise victory over heavily favored Cubans, 7–4 (which guaranteed them finishing first place in the group round). The team finished their Round Robin Tournament in style, hammering the Netherlands 10–0 and beating them on mercy rule.

In the Semifinal match, the team was once again matched up against their arch-rivals Japan. The first half of the game was very tight as Japan was leading 2–1 going into the 7th inning. South Korea soon tied the ballgame at 2 apiece in the bottom half, then took the lead in the 8th thanks in large part to Lee Seung-Yeop's clutch 2-run home run. South Korea added 2 more runs that inning. South Korea eventually ended with a 6–2 victory. In the finals they overcame the perennial favorites Cuba for the second time in the tournament, surviving a bases-loaded 9th inning situation with a double play to win the game 3–2, allowing South Korea to obtain their gold medal for Baseball. South Korea also earned 12 other gold medals during the Olympics making them the second highest gold medalist country after China in Asia.

Asian Games

2010 Asian Games
2010 Asian Games Baseball was held in Guangzhou, China from November 13 to 19, 2010. Only a men's competition was held. All games were played at the Aoti Baseball Field. South Korea beat Chinese Taipei 9–3 in the final to win the gold medal.

2014 Asian Games
2014 Asian Games Baseball was held in Incheon, South Korea from September 22 to 28, 2014. All games were played at the Munhak Baseball Stadium and Mokdong Baseball Stadium. South Korea beat Chinese Taipei 6–3 in the final to win the gold medal.

Other tournaments

Asian Baseball Championship

Players

Roster
The following players were called up to participate in the 2023 World Baseball Classic:

Manager  Lee Kang-chul
Coaches  Kim Ki-tai, Jong Hyun-wook, Kim Min-jae, Kim Min-ho, Bae Young-soo, Shim Jae-hak, Jin Kab-yong

Roster list

World Baseball Classic
 2017 World Baseball Classic roster
 2013 World Baseball Classic roster
 2009 World Baseball Classic roster
 2006 World Baseball Classic roster

Olympic Games
 2020 Summer Olympics roster
 2008 Summer Olympics roster
 2000 Summer Olympics roster
 1996 Summer Olympics roster
 1988 Summer Olympics roster
 1984 Summer Olympics roster

WBSC Premier12
 2015 WBSC Premier12 roster

Asian Games
 2018 Asian Games roster
 2014 Asian Games roster
 2010 Asian Games roster
 2006 Asian Games roster
 2002 Asian Games roster

Notable record

See also
 South Korea national under-18 baseball team

References

External links 

 Korea Baseball Association 

 
Korean, South